McBryde Garden (approx. ) is a botanical garden located on the south shore of Kauai, Hawaii. It is one of five gardens of the non-profit National Tropical Botanical Garden (NTBG).

The garden is situated above Lāwai Bay, in a valley transected by the Lāwai Stream. Queen Emma of Hawaii resided above this valley for a short interval, and a modest house that was perhaps her residence has subsequently been moved to the valley floor and renovated. The valley was purchased by the McBryde family in the late 19th century for a sugarcane plantation. Initially called Lāwai Garden, the site was renamed in 2000 as a result of a generous donation from the McBryde descendants.

Today, McBryde Garden serves as a research and conservation garden. It is home to the largest ex situ collection of native Hawaiian flora in the world, as well as extensive plantings of palms, flowering trees, heliconias, orchids and other plants collected from tropical regions. The Garden contains a major Conservation and Horticulture Center, with nursery and micropropagation laboratory, and is adjacent to NTBG's National Headquarters, with a research and education facilities, and the Allerton Garden.

McBryde Garden is open to visitors. An admission fee is charged.

See also 
 National Tropical Botanical Garden
 Allerton Garden
 Limahuli Garden and Preserve
 Kahanu Garden
 The Kampong
 List of botanical gardens in the United States

References

External links 

 McBryde Garden

Botanical gardens in Hawaii
Protected areas of Kauai
Parks in Hawaii
Protected areas established in 1970
1970 establishments in Hawaii